Ljubiša Vukelja (born 22 July 1983) is a Serbian former footballer who played as a forward.

Club career
Vukelja came through the youth system of Vojvodina, making his first-team debut in 2001. He collected over 100 league appearances for the club in the top flight and scored 22 goals. In June 2006, Vukelja signed a four-year deal with Partizan.

Between 2008 and 2012, Vukelja played for several clubs abroad, including Borac Banja Luka, Vasas, Śląsk Wrocław, Slavija Sarajevo and Čelik Nikšić.

In July 2015, Vukelja moved to Sweden and signed with Nordvärmlands FF. He scored three goals in 10 appearances until the end of the year in Div 2 Norra Götaland, as the club suffered relegation from the league. In the 2016 season, Vukelja scored six goals in 19 matches in Div 3 Västra Svealand, helping the side earn promotion back to the fourth tier of Swedish football. He appeared in 14 games and scored two goals in the 2017 Div 2 Norra Götaland. In the 2018 season, Vukelja made 12 appearances in Div 2 Norra Götaland, scoring no goals.

International career
Vukelja represented Serbia and Montenegro at under-21 level, scoring a hat-trick in a 5–0 win over San Marino during the UEFA Under-21 Championship 2006 qualifying stage.

Honours
Borac Banja Luka
 Bosnia and Herzegovina Cup: 2009–10
Čelik Nikšić
 Montenegrin Cup: 2011–12
 Montenegrin Second League: 2011–12

Notes

References

External links
 
 
 

Association football forwards
Cypriot First Division players
Ekstraklasa players
Ethnikos Achna FC players
Expatriate footballers in Bosnia and Herzegovina
Expatriate footballers in Cyprus
Expatriate footballers in Hungary
Expatriate footballers in Montenegro
Expatriate footballers in Poland
Expatriate footballers in Sweden
First League of Serbia and Montenegro players
FK Borac Banja Luka players
FK Čelik Nikšić players
FK Partizan players
FK Proleter Novi Sad players
FK Radnički Klupci players
FK Slavija Sarajevo players
FK Vojvodina players
Nemzeti Bajnokság I players
Premier League of Bosnia and Herzegovina players
Serbia and Montenegro under-21 international footballers
Serbian expatriate footballers
Serbian expatriate sportspeople in Bosnia and Herzegovina
Serbian expatriate sportspeople in Cyprus
Serbian expatriate sportspeople in Hungary
Serbian expatriate sportspeople in Montenegro
Serbian expatriate sportspeople in Poland
Serbian expatriate sportspeople in Sweden
Serbian First League players
Serbian footballers
Serbian SuperLiga players
Śląsk Wrocław players
Footballers from Novi Sad
Vasas SC players
1983 births
Living people